Somebody Somewhere can refer to:

Somebody Somewhere (album), a 1976 album by Loretta Lynn
Somebody Somewhere (book), 1994 book about autism by Donna Williams
"Somebody Somewhere" (1956 song), a 1956 popular song by Frank Loesser
"Somebody Somewhere" (Dallas Smith song), a 2011 song by Dallas Smith
Somebody Somewhere (TV series), comedy series starring Bridget Everett

See also
Somebody Somewhere (Don't Know What He's Missin' Tonight), a 1976 song by Loretta Lynn